Butler Buchanan Miltonberger (August 31, 1897 – March 23, 1977) was a United States Army major general who served as the first post-World War II Chief of the National Guard Bureau from 1946 to 1947.

Early years
Butler Buchanan Miltonberger was born in North Platte, Nebraska, on August 31, 1897, the son of Ira L. Miltonberger and Jennie Buchanan Miltonberger. He graduated from North Platte High School in spring 1916 and enlisted in Company E of the 5th Infantry Regiment, Nebraska National Guard on June 25, 1916. He was mustered into federal service during the Mexican Border Campaign from July 2, 1916, to February 21, 1917, becoming a sergeant. After his unit returned to Nebraska, he continued in service with the Nebraska National Guard.

World War I

On July 15, 1917, Miltonberger was mustered into service with his unit, which was later drafted into federal service for World War I on August 5, 1917. The 5th Nebraska was redesignated the 134th Infantry Regiment, part of the 34th Division. The 34th Division was stripped of personnel repeatedly while training at Camp Cody, New Mexico in order to provide replacements for other American Expeditionary Force units fighting in France, but Miltonberger sailed overseas with his unit in October 1918; it was subsequently broken up to provide replacements upon arrival in France, and Miltonberger would go on to fight with the 4th Division in the Meuse-Argonne Offensive. He attained the rank of first sergeant before being honorably discharged on August 6, 1919.

Post World War I

On May 12, 1923, Miltonberger reenlisted in the Nebraska National Guard in North Platte and was commissioned a first lieutenant in Company D, 134th Infantry Regiment, 35th Division. He was promoted to captain on November 10, 1923 as commander of Company D. Miltonberger was promoted to major and commander of the 1st Battalion, 134th Infantry Regiment on January 14, 1933. In June 1935, his unit was mobilized by Nebraska Governor Robert Leroy Cochran and sent to Omaha in response to civil disturbances stemming from an ongoing dispute between labor and management of the Omaha Traction Company. In January 1939, he single-handedly captured Willard Brucks, an escaped killer from Ohio who had broken into the Omaha armory to seize weapons. Miltonberger was promoted to lieutenant colonel on October 7, 1940.

In the peacetime period between World Wars I and II, his units usually trained one night a week at their local armories and for two weeks every summer at Camp Ashland, Nebraska. Large U.S. Army maneuvers in which the 35th Division took part were held at Camp Funston, Fort Riley, Kansas, in 1937, and at Camp Ripley, Minnesota, in 1940. On December 23, 1940, the 35th Division was mobilized for one year of federal service by President Franklin D. Roosevelt, and took part in the Louisiana Maneuvers in August and September 1941.

In his civilian capacity, Miltonberger worked in North Platte as a postman, and was also employed in road and bridge surveying and construction.

World War II

Immediately before U.S. entry into World War II, Miltonberger was promoted to colonel on November 10, 1941, as commander of the 134th Infantry Regiment. In 1944 and 1945, led his regiment throughout France, Belgium, and the Netherlands, including at Saint-Lô, across the Vire River, at Mortain, Nancy, the Moselle River, Morhange, Sarreguemines, and at Bastogne during the Battle of the Bulge.

In February 1945, Miltonberger was promoted to brigadier general and assigned as assistant division commander of Major General Paul W. Baade's 35th Infantry Division, replacing Brigadier General Edmund B. Sebree. By the end of the war in Europe, the 35th Infantry Division reached the Elbe River in Germany. In November 1945, he returned to the United States and remained on active duty at the War Department.

Chief of National Guard Bureau
In 1946, President Harry S. Truman, a fellow veteran of the 35th Infantry Division, nominated Miltonberger to be the first post-war Chief of the National Guard Bureau as a major general.  As Chief, Miltonberger worked to reorganize the National Guard following its demobilization after World War II, including the formation of the new Air National Guard. Miltonberger became ill and entered the hospital in December 1946, and he retired from active duty military service in September 1947 because of chronic sarcoidosis of the lungs.

Later career
After his retirement, Miltonberger returned to Nebraska. He resided in North Platte and Lincoln, and was employed by the Nebraska State Engineer.

In 1950, he became Chairman of the "Miltonberger Board", which consisted of current and former National Guard officers and was empowered to review the National Guard's organizational structure, internal policies and operational procedures, and make recommendations for long term improvements.

Death and burial

Miltonberger, who had been ill with emphysema, died in North Platte on March 23, 1977 at the age of 79 after suffering complications from surgery to repair a broken hip suffered in a fall. He was survived by his second wife, Caroline, two daughters, Helen and Veatrice, and a son, Butler. Jr. He is buried at Fort McPherson National Cemetery near Maxwell, Nebraska.

Awards and decorations
Miltonberger's awards included the Distinguished Service Medal, Silver Star, Legion of Merit, Bronze Star Medal, the French Croix de Guerre, the Netherlands Order of Orange-Nassau, the Luxembourg War Cross and the Combat Infantryman Badge.

References

External links
 at the Nebraska State Historical Society
 at the Nebraska State Historical Society
Miltonberger, Butler B. and Huston, James, 134th Infantry History. Gering, Nebraska: Currior Press, 1950.
"'All Hell' Couldn't Stop Miltonberger", North Platte Telegraph-Bulletin, September 17, 1973.
Fort McPherson National Cemetery
Butler B. Miltonberger at Find A Grave, accessed April 22, 2013
Generals of World War II

1897 births
1977 deaths
Military personnel from Nebraska
United States Army personnel of World War I
United States Army generals
National Guard (United States) generals
People from North Platte, Nebraska
Burials at Fort McPherson National Cemetery
Chiefs of the National Guard Bureau
Recipients of the Distinguished Service Medal (US Army)
Recipients of the Silver Star
Recipients of the Legion of Merit
Recipients of the Croix de Guerre 1939–1945 (France)
Officers of the Order of Orange-Nassau
United States Army generals of World War II